John "Jack" Swann (born 10 July 1893 in Easington, died 1990) was an English footballer. During his career, Swann played for Leeds United, Huddersfield Town, Watford and Queens Park Rangers. He appeared in the 1920 FA Cup Final for Huddersfield. At Leeds, he helped the team win the Division 2 title, and went on to make over 100 appearances.

When Jack was almost 88 years old he attended the centenary FA Cup Final at Wembley as a VIP because he was the oldest surviving footballer from an FA Cup Final.

References

External links
Profile at leeds-fans.org.uk

1893 births
1990 deaths
Sportspeople from Easington, County Durham
Footballers from County Durham
English footballers
English Football League players
Leeds United F.C. players
Huddersfield Town A.F.C. players
Watford F.C. players
Queens Park Rangers F.C. players
Association football forwards
FA Cup Final players